Eruption Radio is a London-based radio station that broadcasts online and on DAB playing house, breakbeat and happy hardcore, and drum and bass as well as other genres. Eruption Radio originally started life in February 1993 as Eruption FM, a pirate radio station broadcasting from Waltham Forest, East London, broadcasting until February 2012. 

Eruption returned as an online station on 17 May 2019, with many of its original DJs. As of 2 February 2021, Eruption commenced broadcasting on small-scale DAB in the Bristol area, and Cambridge.

Notable presenters and DJs have included DJ Zinc, Billy 'Daniel' Bunter, Nicky Blackmarket, and DJ Hype.

References

External links 
 Official website

Radio stations in London
Former pirate radio stations
Pirate radio stations in the United Kingdom
Radio stations established in 1993
Radio stations disestablished in 2012
Radio stations established in 2019
Electronic dance music radio stations in the United Kingdom
House music radio stations